This is a list of notable restaurants in China.

Restaurants

Coffee and tea houses

Fast food chains

See also

 Chinese cuisine
 Chinese restaurant
 Chinese restaurants (category)
 List of companies of China
 List of Chinese dishes
 List of Chinese desserts
 List of Chinese restaurants
 List of Michelin starred restaurants Hong Kong
 List of restaurants in Hong Kong
 Lists of restaurants

References

External links
 

Chinese cuisine-related lists
Lists of companies of China
China